Doctor Foster may refer to:

 "Doctor Foster", an English nursery rhyme
Doctor Foster (TV series), a British television drama
 Dr Foster Intelligence, a healthcare information company